The 2010 Seattle Mariners season was the  34th season in franchise history. The Mariners finished the season with 61 wins and 101 losses. As the Texas Rangers won their first pennant that season, the Mariners became one of only two teams to have never played in the World Series, along with the Washington Nationals.

Offseason

Coaching staff changes
Most of the 2009 major league coaching staff was retained, with the exception of third base coach Bruce Hines. Mike Brumley was named the new third base coach on October 30, 2009. On December 7, the Mariners announced their minor league staff. Eriberto Menchaca, who managed the Class-A Clinton LumberKings in 2009, was moved to the rookie-level Pulaski Mariners, Jesus Azuaje was named manager of the rookie-level Peoria Mariners, Tim Laker was named the manager of the Double-A West Tenn Diamond Jaxx, and Andy Fox was named hitting coach for the Diamond Jaxx.

Roster changes

Key departures

On October 19, 2009, catcher Kenji Johjima, the first Japanese-born catcher in Major League Baseball, exercised an opt-out clause in his contract and returned to playing in Nippon Professional Baseball. The Mariners also lost their home run leader, Russell Branyan, who declined a one-year deal with the Mariners to test the free agent market. Two-time Gold Glove winner Adrián Beltré opted for free agency on November 5, 2009, and later signed with the Boston Red Sox. The third baseman declined $12 million in arbitration from the Mariners only days after the team signed Chone Figgins (see below). Beltre officially parted ways with the Mariners when he signed a one-year, $9 million deal with the Boston Red Sox. Pitcher Phillippe Aumont, noted as one of the top prospects in the organization, was sent to the Phillies in the trade for Cliff Lee. Also, pitcher Brandon Morrow was traded to the Toronto Blue Jays as well. Carlos Silva, whose time in Seattle was plagued by injury, was traded to the Chicago Cubs on December 18.

Major league acquisitions
Chone Figgins signed a four-year contract valued at $36 million. General manager Jack Zduriencik noted Figgins' versatility on defense and could ask him to play second base as well.

Ken Griffey Jr. returned to the Mariners with a one-year deal after a successful 2009 season and large number of Seattle fans asking for "one more year." Shortstop Jack Wilson signed a two-year, $10 million deal to remain in Seattle. Wilson was one of the players received from the Pittsburgh Pirates at the trading deadline in 2009.

On December 14, 2009, the Mariners, along with the three other organizations including the Philadelphia Phillies, the Toronto Blue Jays, and the Oakland Athletics agreed to a 4-team, 9-player deal. The Mariners received former Cy Young Award winner Cliff Lee from Philadelphia in exchange for three prospects as a complement to ace Félix Hernández.

On December 18, 2009, the Mariners traded pitcher Carlos Silva and cash considerations to the Chicago Cubs for outfielder Milton Bradley, particularly noting his offensive capabilities. On December 22, the Mariners traded Brandon Morrow to the Toronto Blue Jays for pitcher Brandon League, and a minor league prospect. The Mariners acquired first baseman Casey Kotchman from the Boston Red Sox in exchange for utility player Bill Hall, a player to be named later, and cash considerations. On January 29, 2010, the Mariner signed outfielder Eric Byrnes to a one-year, $400,000 contract after he was released by the Arizona Diamondbacks. The Mariners signed first baseman Ryan Garko to a one-year $550,000 contract on February 1. On February 6, the Mariners re-signed pitcher Érik Bédard to a one-year, $1.5 million contract, with a mutual option for 2011.

Minor league acquisitions

After the World Series, the Mariners cleared five spots from their 40-man roster after infielder Bryan LaHair, pitchers César Jiménez, Randy Messenger and Marwin Vega were outrighted to the Triple-A Tacoma Rainiers, and pitcher Justin Thomas was claimed off waivers by the Pittsburgh Pirates. The Mariners added seven new scouts after the season including the West Coast Supervisor Butch Baccala, Southern California scout John Ramey, Northwest scout Joe Ross, Midwest scout Tony Russo, Southwest scout Jess Kapellusch, Atlantic scout Mike Moriarty, and Gulf Coast scout Devitt Moore. 

On November 25, the Mariners re-signed minor league pitchers Steve Bray and Steven Shell, and catcher José Yépez. On December 9, the Mariners signed outfielder Corey Patterson to a minor league contract with an invitation to spring training. It was reported by Baseball America that the Mariners signed pitcher Levale Speigner and infielder Travis Denker, and also re-signed pitcher Chris Seddon and Josh Wilson to minor league contracts on December 12. On December 16, the Mariners signed 19-year-old Brazilian prospect Pedro Okuda to a minor league contract. During the trade for Cliff Lee, the Mariners gave up three prospects including pitchers Phillippe Aumont and J. C. Ramírez and outfielder Tyson Gillies.

On December 22, Baseball America reported that the Mariners re-signed pitcher Mike Koplove, and signed pitcher David Pauley, and catcher Ralph Henriquez Jr. During the trade for Brandon League, the Mariners also acquired minor league outfielder Johermyn Chávez from the Blue Jays. On December 28, the Mariners signed catcher Josh Bard, and re-signed pitcher Chad Cordero to minor league contracts with invitations to spring training. The Mariners signed free agent utility player Chris Woodward, who was in their organization during the first half of the 2009 season, to a minor league contract with an invitation to spring training. On January 13, the Mariners re-signed first baseman Brad Nelson to a minor league contract with and invitation to spring training. Formerly of the Milwaukee Brewers organization, Jesús Colomé signed a minor league contract with an invitation to spring training with the Mariners on February 10. On February 12, 2010, the Mariners signed Mike Sweeney, a player who MLB.com called a "key clubhouse component from the Mariners' dramatic 2009 turnaround", to a minor league contract with an invitation to spring training.

Minor league rankings
During the offseason, MLB.com ranked Mariners' first round draft Dustin Ackley as the 15th best prospect in Minor League Baseball. Ackley was also named the best prospect in the Mariners' organization by Baseball America, followed by outfielder Michael Saunders, catcher Adam Moore, third baseman Alex Liddi, infielder Carlos Triunfel, pitcher Michael Pineda, shortstop Nick Franklin, outfielder Greg Halman, pitcher Dan Cortes, and corner infielder Mario Martínez. Baseball America also ranked players by their specific talents. Ackley was named best hitter for average, Halman was named best hitter for power, and best athlete, outfielder Ezequiel Carrera was named both best strike-zone discipline, and fastest base runner, Pineda was named as having the best fastball, and the best control of pitches, pitcher Josh Fields was named as having the best curveball, pitcher Steven Hensley was named as having the best slider, pitcher Nick Hill was named as having the best changeup, Steve Baron was named the best defensive catcher, Gabriel Noriega was named the best defensive infielder, Triunfel was named as having the best throwing arm amongst infielders, Saunders was named best defensive outfielder, and James Jones was named as the having the best throwing arm amongst outfielders.

Salary arbitration
Five Mariners' players filed for salary arbitration in January 2010. The list of filers included pitchers David Aardsma, Félix Hernández, Brandon League and Mark Lowe, and first baseman Casey Kotchman. On January 18, Aardsma, Hernández and Lowe signed new contracts with the Mariners, avoiding arbitration. Aardsma signed a deal for $2.75 million, and Lowe signed a deal worth $1.15 million. Hernández's five-year deal was worth $80 million. On January 20, the Mariners came to an agreement with League for a one-year $900,000 deal, avoiding arbitration. Kotchman, the last arbitration eligible player on the Mariners roster, agreed to a $3.5 million contract on February 3, avoiding arbitration, and settling all the Mariners' arbitration cases.

Complete transactions
Source for official major league transactions

2009

October
October 19: Justin Thomas designated for assignment. Ten days later, he was claimed by the Pittsburgh Pirates off waivers.
October 29: Outrighted pitchers César Jiménez, Randy Messenger and Marwin Vega, and first baseman Bryan LaHair to the Triple-A Tacoma Rainiers.

November
November 4: Claimed Yusmeiro Petit off waivers from the Arizona Diamondbacks.
November 20: Pitcher Chris Jakubauskas claimed off waivers by the Pittsburgh Pirates.
Pitcher Robert Manuel claimed off waivers by the Boston Red Sox.
Called-up pitchers Dan Cortes, Ricky Orta, Edward Paredes, J. C. Ramírez and Anthony Varvaro.
Outrighted infielder Josh Wilson to Triple-A Tacoma.
 Activated pitchers Ryan Feierabend and Sean White from the disabled list.
Signed catcher Eliézer Alfonzo to a minor league contract.

December
December 8: Signed third baseman Chone Figgins to a four-year, $36 million contract.
December 10: Signed center fielder Corey Patterson to a minor league contract.
Selected pitcher Kanekoa Texeira from the New York Yankees in the Rule 5 draft.
Re-signed shortstop Jack Wilson to a two-year, $10 million contract.
December 16: Signed shortstop Pedro Okuda to a minor league contract.
Traded pitchers J. C. Ramírez and Phillippe Aumont and outfielder Tyson Gillies to the Philadelphia Phillies for pitcher Cliff Lee.
December 18: Re-signed outfielder Ryan Langerhans to a minor league contract.
Traded pitcher Carlos Silva to the Chicago Cubs for outfielder Milton Bradley.
December 23: Traded pitcher Brandon Morrow to the Toronto Blue Jays for pitcher Brandon League and outfielder Johermyn Chávez.
December 28: Signed catcher Josh Bard and pitcher Chad Cordero to minor league contracts.

2010

January
January 6: Signed outfielder Chris Woodward to a minor league contract.
January 7: Traded utility player Bill Hall to the Boston Red Sox for first baseman Casey Kotchman.
January 13: Re-signed first baseman Brad Nelson to a minor league contract.
January 15: Claimed first baseman Tommy Everidge off of waivers from the Oakland Athletics.
January 29: Signed outfielder Eric Byrnes to a one-year $400,000 contract.
First baseman Tommy Everidge designated for assignment.

February
February 1: Signed first baseman Ryan Garko to a one-year, $550,000 contract.
Pitcher Pitcher Gaby Hernandez designated for assignment.
February 3: Outrighted first baseman Tommy Everidge to the Triple-A Tacoma Rainiers.
February 6: Re-signed pitcher Érik Bédard to a one-year, $1.5 million contract.
Pitcher Pitcher Yusmeiro Petit designated for assignment.
February 10: Signed pitcher Jesús Colomé to a minor league contract  with an invitation to spring training.
Pitcher Yusmeiro Petit outrighted to the Triple-A Tacoma Rainiers.
Pitcher Gaby Hernandez claimed off waivers by the Boston Red Sox.
February 12: Signed designated hitter Mike Sweeney to a minor league contract with an invitation to spring training.

March
March 3: Pitchers Kenn Kasparek and Anthony Vasquez assigned to the Mariners.
March 4: Pitchers James Gillheeney and Erasmo Ramirez; shortstop Carlos Triunfel; and Kyle Seager assigned to the Mariners.
March 5: Pitchers Andrew Carraway and Michael Pineda; and shortstop Juan Díaz assigned to the Mariners.
March 6: Pitchers Aaron Jensen and Steve Bray; shortstop Nick Franklin; and third baseman Alex Liddi assigned to the Mariners.
March 8: Catchers Ralph Henriquez and Hassiel Jimenez; third baseman Matt Mangini; and outfielders James Jones and Denny Almonte assigned to the Mariners.
March 10: Optioned pitcher Ryan Feierabend to the Triple-A Tacoma Rainiers.
March 11: Pitchers Kyle Parker and Wes Littleton; and outfielders Maximo Mendez and Johermyn Chávez assigned to the Mariners.
March 12: Pitcher Andrew Baldwin assigned to the Mariners.
March 13: Optioned outfielder Greg Halman to the Triple-A Tacoma Rainiers.
Infielder Joseph Dunigan assigned to the Mariners.
March 14: Third baseman Mario Martinez and outfielder Carlos Peguero assigned to the Mariners.
March 16: Optioned pitchers Dan Cortes, Ricky Orta, Edward Paredes and Anthony Varvaro; and infielder Dustin Ackley to the Double-A West Tenn Diamond Jaxx.
Optioned outfielder Ezequiel Carrera to the Triple-A Tacoma Rainiers.
March 17: Released pitcher Yusmeiro Petit.
March 18: Signed second baseman Travis Denker.
Pitcher Marwin Vega assigned to the Mariners.
Optioned outfielder Michael Saunders to the Triple-A Tacoma Rainiers.
Traded pitcher Miguel Celestino to the Boston Red Sox.
March 20: Infielders Shaver Hansen and Gabriel Noriega; and outfielder Welington Dotel assigned to the Mariners.
March 21: Shortstop Jeffrey Dominguez and outfielder Johan Limonta assigned to the Mariners.
March 22: Outfielder Daniel Carroll assigned to the Mariners.
March 23: Pitcher Steven Richard assigned to the Mariners.
March 24: Catcher Brandon Bantz assigned to the Mariners.
March 25: Pitchers Preston Vancil and Nick Czyz; catcher Blake Ochoa; infielder Edilio Colina; and outfielders Kalian Sams and Kuo Hui Lo assigned to the Mariners.
Optioned first baseman Mike Carp to the Triple-A Tacoma Rainiers.
March 27: Pitcher Steven Hensley assigned to the Mariners.
March 29: Pitcher Chris Kirkland assigned to the Mariners.
March 31: Outfielder Corey Patterson filed for free agency.
Pitcher Brian Moran and James McOwen to the Mariners.
Optioned Luke French to the Triple-A Tacoma Rainiers.
Placed pitcher Érik Bédard on the 15-Day disabled list retroactive to March 26, 2010.
Placed third baseman Jack Hannahan on the 15-Day disabled list retroactive to March 26, 2010.

April
April 1: First baseman Ryan Garko was claimed by the Texas Rangers.
Optioned Garrett Olson to the Triple-A Tacoma Rainiers.
Pitcher Seon Gi Kim assigned to the Mariners.
April 4: Placed pitcher Cliff Lee on the 15-Day disabled list retroactive to March 26, 2010.
Pitcher Yusmeiro Petit and outfielder Corey Patterson assigned to the Mariners.
Called-up Mike Sweeney from the Triple-A Tacoma Rainiers.
April 5: Catchers José Yépez and Luis Oliveros assigned to the Double-A West Tenn Diamond Jaxx.
Outfielder Maximo Mendez assigned to the Class-A Advanced High Desert Mavericks.
Outfielder Kalian Sams assigned to the Class-A Clinton LumberKings.
April 7: Pitchers Mike Koplove, Chris Seddon, Steven Shell, Steve Bray, Chad Cordero, Jesús Colomé, David Pauley and Levale Speigner; catchers Eliézer Alfonzo and Josh Bard; and infielders Brad Nelson, Josh Wilson and Chris Woodward assigned to the Triple-A Tacoma Rainiers.

Spring training

Non-roster invitees
Seattle invited 23 players to spring training including catchers Eliézer Alfonzo, Josh Bard, Steven Baron, Luis Oliveros and Guillermo Quiróz, infielders Tommy Everidge, Brad Nelson, Josh Wilson and Chris Woodward, outfielders Corey Patterson and Mike Wilson, designated hitter Mike Sweeney, and pitchers Jesús Colomé, Chad Cordero, Josh Fields, Nick Hill, Mike Koplove, David Pauley, Yusmeiro Petit, Mauricio Robles, Chris Seddon, Steven Shell and Levale Speigner.

Injuries
On February 8, newly acquired pitcher Cliff Lee underwent minor surgery to remove a floating bone spur in his left foot. Lee was expected to be out two-to-three weeks, making him unable to report to spring training at the scheduled time. On March 4, closer David Aardsma experienced tightness in his groin causing him to miss playing time. Shortstop Jack Wilson suffered from right hamstring tightness after a Mariners' game in early March. On March 19, it was announced that pitcher Cliff Lee could start the season on the disabled list because of a right lower abdominal strain. At the end of spring training, Lee was placed on the 15-day disabled list for the aforementioned reason. On April 3, Mariners' minor leaguer James McOwen dislocated his shoulder while attempting to catch a ball hit by Clint Barmes.

Roster moves
On March 10, 2010, the Mariners cut 10 people from their spring roster including Ryan Feierabend, Josh Fields, Steven Shell, Nick Hill, Chris Seddon, Mauricio Robles, Luis Oliveros and Steven Baron. On March 17, the Mariners released pitcher Yusmeiro Petit whom they had claimed off waivers on November 4, 2009. Michael Saunders, an outfielder who played limited time with the Mariners in 2009, was optioned to the Triple-A Tacoma Rainiers on March 18. On March 18, the Mariners traded minor league pitcher Miguel Celestino to the Boston Red Sox to complete the trade for Casey Kotchman. First baseman Mike Carp was assigned to minor league camp on March 25, and was informed that he would start the season with the Triple-A Tacoma Rainiers. On March 31, outfielder Corey Patterson opted out of his contract with the Mariners and field for free agency. Also on March 31, the Mariners assigned pitcher Chad Cordero to minor league camp, and optioned Luke French to the Triple-A Tacoma Rainiers.

Regular season

Overview
Retired pitcher Randy Johnson agreed to throw out the ceremonial first pitch before the home opener at Safeco Field. Johnson, who spent 10 seasons in Seattle, reportedly accepted the request immediately. In the first game of the seasons against the Oakland Athletics at Oakland–Alameda County Coliseum, the Mariners won by a score of 5–3. Seattle reliever Brandon League got the win while Oakland reliever Brad Ziegler got the loss. On August 9 manager Don Wakamatsu was dismissed as manager and Daren Brown was named his replacement on an interim basis. The Mariners ended the season scoring only 513 runs, the lowest since the American League (AL) instituted the designated hitter in 1973. The Mariners were also last in the AL in team batting average at .236 and also ranked last in most other offensive categories this season.

Game log

|-  bgcolor="ffbbbb"
|- align="center" bgcolor="bbffbb"
| 1 || April 5 || @ Athletics || 5–3 || League (1–0) || Ziegler (0–1) || Aardsma (1) || 30,686 || 1–0 || 
|-
|- align="center" bgcolor="#ffbbbb"
| 2 || April 6 || @ Athletics || 1–2 ||E. Ramírez (1–0) || Texeira (0–1) || — || 10,090 || 1–1 || 
|-
|- align="center" bgcolor="#ffbbbb"
| 3 || April 7 || @ Athletics || 5–6 || Blevins (1–0) || Lowe (0–1) || — || 18,194 || 1–2 || 
|-
|- align="center" bgcolor="#ffbbbb"
| 4 || April 8 || @ Athletics || 2–6 || Anderson (1–0) || Fister (0–1) || — || 12,464 || 1–3 || 
|-
|- align="center" bgcolor="#ffbbbb"
| 5 || April 9 || @ Rangers || 2–6 || Lewis (1–0) || Vargas (0–1) || — || 25,271 || 1–4 || 
|-
|- align="center" bgcolor="bbffbb"
| 6 || April 10 || @ Rangers || 4–3 || Lowe (1–1) || Francisco (1–2) || Aardsma (2) || 26,861 || 2–4 || 
|-
|- align="center" bgcolor="#ffbbbb"
| 7 || April 11 || @ Rangers || 2–9 || Feldman (1–0) || Snell (0–1) || — || 26,846 || 2–5 || 
|-
|- align="center" bgcolor="#ffbbbb"
| 8 || April 12 || Athletics || 0–4 || Duchscherer (1–0) || Rowland-Smith (0–1) || — || 45,876 || 2–6 || 
|-
|- align="center" bgcolor="#bbffbb"
| 9 || April 13 || Athletics || 3–0 || Fister (1–1) || Ziegler (0–2) || Aardsma (3) || 18,043 || 3–6 || 
|-
|- align="center" bgcolor="#bbffbb"
| 10 || April 14 || Athletics || 4–2 || Vargas (1–1) || Gaudin (0–1) || Aardsma (4) || 15,978 || 4–6 || 
|-
|- align="center" bgcolor="#bbffbb"
| 11 || April 16 || Tigers || 11–3 || Hernández (1–0) || Bonderman (1–1) || —  || 39,999 || 5–6 || 
|-
|- align="center" bgcolor="#bbffbb"
| 12 || April 17 || Tigers || 4–2 || League (2–0) ||Verlander (0–1) || Aardsma (5) || 31,647 || 6–6 || 
|-
|- align="center" bgcolor="#ffbbbb"
| 13 || April 18 || Tigers || 2–4 || Scherzer (1–1) || Snell (0–2) || Valverde (3) || 30,419 || 6–7 || 
|-
|- align="center" bgcolor="#bbffbb"
| 14 || April 19 || Orioles || 8–2 || Fister (2–1) || Bergesen (0–2) || — || 14,528 || 7–7 || 
|-
|- align="center" bgcolor="#bbffbb"
| 15 || April 20 || Orioles || 3–1 || Vargas (2–1) || Hernandez (0–3) || Aardsma (6) || 15,931 || 8–7 || 
|-
|- align="center" bgcolor="bbffbb"
| 16 || April 21 || Orioles || 4–1 || Hernández (2–0) || Millwood (0–3) || — || 18,401 || 9–7 || 
|-
|- align="center" bgcolor="#ffbbbb"
| 17 || April 23 || @ White Sox || 6–7 || Thornton (2–1) || Lowe (1–2) || — || 24,653 || 9–8 || 
|-
|- align="center" bgcolor="#ffbbbb"
| 18 || April 24 || @ White Sox || 4–5 || Jenks (1–0) || Aardsma (0–1) || — || 25,253 || 9–9 || 
|-
|- align="center" bgcolor="#ffbbbb"
| 19 || April 25 || @ White Sox || 2–3 || Danks (3–0) || League (2–1) || Jenks (4) || 28,274 || 9–10 || 
|-
|- align="center" bgcolor="#ffbbbb"
| 20 || April 26 || @ Royals || 1–3 || Davies (2–1) || Hernández (2–1) || Chen (1) || 11,391 || 9–11 || 
|-
|- align="center" bgcolor="bbffbb"
| 21 || April 27 || @ Royals || 3–2 || Kelley (1–0) || Rupe (0–1) || Aardsma (7) || 14,969 || 10–11 || 
|-
|- align="center" bgcolor="bbffbb"
| 22 || April 28 || @ Royals || 6–5 || League (3–1) || Thompson (0–1) || Aardsma (8) || 13,206 || 11–11 || 
|-
|- align="center" bgcolor="#ffbbbb"
| 23 || April 30 || Rangers || 0–2 (12) || Francisco (3–3) || League (3–2) || Feliz (4) || 34,055 || 11–12 || 
|-

|- bgcolor="ffbbbb"
|- align="center" bgcolor="#ffbbbb"
| 24 || May 1 || Rangers || 3–6 || Harrison (1–1) || Hernández (2–2) || Francisco (2) || 30,225 || 11–13 || 
|- align="center" bgcolor="#ffbbbb"
| 25 || May 2 || Rangers || 1–3 (11) || Nippert (1–2) || Lowe (1–3) || Feliz (5) || 27,185 || 11–14 || 
|- align="center" bgcolor="#ffbbbb"
| 26 || May 4 || Rays || 2–5 || Shields (4–0) || Vargas (2–2) || Soriano (7) || 15,589 || 11–15 || 
|- align="center" bgcolor="#ffbbbb"
| 27 || May 5 || Rays || 3–8 || Garza (5–1) || Lee (0–1) ||  || 14,627 || 11–16 || 
|- align="center" bgcolor="#ffbbbb"
| 28 || May 6 || Rays || 0–8 || Niemann (2–0) || Rowland-Smith (0–2) ||  || 17,617 || 11–17 || 
|- align="center" bgcolor="ffbbbb"
| 29 || May 7 || Angels || 0–8 || Weaver (4–1) || Hernández (2–3) ||  || 37,602 || 11–18 || 
|- align="center" bgcolor="ffbbbb"
| 30 || May 8 || Angels || 3–4 (10)|| Rodney (3–0) || Aardsma (0–2) || Fuentes (4) || 30,446 || 11–19 || 
|- align="center" bgcolor="bbffbb"
| 31 || May 9 || Angels || 8–1 || Vargas (3–2) || Santana (1–3) ||  || 28,668 || 12–19 || 
|- align="center" bgcolor="bbffbb"
| 32 || May 11 || @ Orioles || 5–1 || Lee (1–1) || Hernandez (0–5) || League (1) || 12,614 || 13–19 || 
|- align="center" bgcolor="ffbbbb"
| 33 || May 12 || @ Orioles || 2–5 || Bergesen (3–2) || Rowland-Smith (0–3) || Simón (4) || 11,448 || 13–20 || 
|- align="center" bgcolor="ffbbbb"
| 34 || May 13 || @ Orioles || 5–6 || Hendrickson (1–0) || League (3–3) || Simón (5) || 20,938 || 13–21 || 
|- align="center" bgcolor="bbffbb"
| 35 || May 14 || @ Rays || 4–3 || Fister (3–1)  || Davis (3–3)  || Aardsma (9)  || 27,856 || 14–21 || 
|- align="center" bgcolor="ffbbbb"
| 36 || May 15 || @ Rays || 2–3 || Soriano (2–0)  || Colomé (0–1)  ||  || 23,627 || 14–22 || 
|- align="center" bgcolor="ffbbbb"
| 37 || May 16 || @ Rays || 1–2 || Wheeler (2–0)  || Lee (1–2)  || Soriano (10)  || 23,005 || 14–23 || 
|- align="center" bgcolor="ffbbbb"
| 38 || May 17 || @ Athletics || 4–8 || Gonzalez (4–3) || Rowland-Smith (0–4) ||  || 10,051 || 14–24 || 
|- align="center" bgcolor="ffbbbb"
| 39 || May 18 || @ Athletics || 5–6 (10) || Breslow (1–1) || League (3–4) ||  || 10,512 || 14–25 || 
|- align="center" bgcolor="ffbbbb"
| 40 || May 19 || Blue Jays || 2–3 || Cecil (3–2) || Fister (3–2) || Gregg (12) || 19,208 || 14–26 || 
|- align="center" bgcolor="bbffbb"
| 41 || May 20 || Blue Jays || 4–3 || Kelley (2–0) || Gregg (0–1) ||  || 20,452 || 15–26 || 
|- align="center" bgcolor="bbffbb"
| 42 || May 21 || Padres || 15–8 || Lee (2–2) || Leblanc (2–2) ||  || 24,139 || 16–26 || 
|- align="center" bgcolor="ffbbbb"
| 43 || May 22 || Padres || 1–2 || Richard (4–2) || Snell (0–3) || Bell (12) || 28,670 || 16–27 || 
|- align="center" bgcolor="ffbbbb"
| 44 || May 23 || Padres || 1–8 || Latos (4–3) || Hernández (2–4) ||  || 33,315 || 16–28 || 
|- align="center" bgcolor="bbffbb"
| 45 || May 25 || Tigers || 5–3 || Kelley (3–0) || Verlander (5–3) || Aardsma (10) || 20,920 || 17–28 || 
|- align="center" bgcolor="bbffbb"
| 46 || May 26 || Tigers || 5–4 || League (4–4) || Perry (1–3) || Aardsma (11) || 22,422 || 18–28 || 
|- align="center" bgcolor="bbffbb"
| 47 || May 28 || @ Angels || 8–3 || Lee (3–2) || Kazmir ||  || 41,770 || 19–28 || 
|- align="center" bgcolor="ffbbbb"
| 48 || May 29 || @ Angels || 5–1 (10) || Fuentes (3–1) || League (4–5) ||  || 39,382 || 19–29 || 
|- align="center" bgcolor="ffbbbb"
| 49 || May 30 || @ Angels || 9–7 || Rodney (0–3) || Aardsma (4–0) ||  || 40,017 || 19–30 || 
|- align="center" bgcolor="ffbbbb"
| 50 || May 31 || Twins || 5–4 || Liriano (5–3) || Fister (3–3) || Rauch (13) || 19,795 || 19–31 || 
|-

|- bgcolor="ffbbbb"
|- align="center" bgcolor="bbffbb"
| 51 || June 1 || Twins || 7–1 || Vargas (4–2) || Blackburn (6–2) ||  || 18,740 || 20–31 || 
|- align="center" bgcolor="bbffbb"
| 52 || June 2 || Twins || 2–1 (10) || League (5–5) || Guerrier (0–1) ||  || 20,414 || 21–31 || 
|- align="center" bgcolor="bbffbb"
| 53 || June 3 || Twins || 4–1 || Hernández (3–4) || Pavano (5–6) || Aardsma (12) || 21,291 || 22–31  || 
|- align="center" bgcolor="ffbbbb"
| 54 || June 4 || Angels || 7–1 || Saunders (4–6) || Snell (0–4) ||  || 29,230 || 22–32 || 
|- align="center" bgcolor="ffbbbb"
| 55 || June 5 || Angels || 11–2 || Santana (6–3) || Olson (0–1) ||  || 31,548 || 22–33 || 
|- align="center" bgcolor="ffbbbb"
| 56 || June 6 || Angels || 9–4 || Piñeiro (4–6) || Kelley (3–1)||  || 33,076 || 22–34 ||  
|- align="center" bgcolor="bbffbb"
| 57 || June 7 || @ Rangers || 4–2 || Lee (4–2) || Feldman (3–6) ||  || 20,152 || 23–34 || 
|- align="center" bgcolor="ffbbbb"
| 58 || June 8 || @ Rangers || 7–1 || Lewis (5–4) || Hernández (3–5) ||  || 18,774 || 23–35 || 
|- align="center" bgcolor="ffbbbb"
| 59 || June 9 || @ Rangers || 12–2 || Wilson (5–3) || Snell (0–5) ||  || 26,432 || 23–36 || 
|- align="center" bgcolor="ffbbbb"
| 60 || June 10 || @ Rangers || 12–3 || Hunter (2–0) || Rowland-Smith (0–5) ||  || 19,674 || 23–37 || 
|- align="center" bgcolor="ffbbbb"
| 61 || June 11 || @ Padres || 4–3 || Thatcher (1–0) || Aardsma (0–4) ||  || 20,049 || 23–38 || 
|- align="center" bgcolor="ffbbbb"
| 62 || June 12 || @ Padres || 7–1 || LeBlanc (4–4) || Lee (4–3) ||  || 30,019 || 23–39 || 
|- align="center" bgcolor="bbffbb"
| 63 || June 13 || @ Padres || 4–2 || Hernández (4–5) || Gregerson (1–2) || Aardsma (13) || 23,429 || 24–39 || 
|- align="center" bgcolor="ffbbbb"
| 64 || June 14 || @ Cardinals || 9–3 || Wainwright (9–4) || French (0–1) ||  || 36,113 || 24–40 || 
|- align="center" bgcolor="ffbbbb"
| 65 || June 15 || @ Cardinals || 4–2 || Hawksworth (1–3) || Rowland-Smith (0–6) || Franklin (12) || 40,269 || 24–41 || 
|- align="center" bgcolor="bbffbb"
| 66 || June 16 || @ Cardinals || 2–1 || Vargas (5–2) || García (6–3) || Aardsma (14) || 40,020 || 25–41 || 
|- align="center" bgcolor="bbffbb"
| 67 || June 18 || Reds || 1–0 || Lee (5–3) || Cueto (6–2) ||  || 43,362 || 26–41 || 
|- align="center" bgcolor="bbffbb"
| 68 || June 19 || Reds || 5–1 || Hernández (5–5) || LeCure (1–4) ||  || 26,468 || 27–41 || 
|- align="center" bgcolor="bbffbb"
| 69 || June 20 || Reds || 1–0 || Rowland-Smith (1–6) || Harang (5–7) || Aardsma (15) || 32,712 || 28–41 || 
|- align="center" bgcolor="bbffbb"
| 70 || June 22 || Cubs || 2–0 ||Vargas (6–2)  || Dempster (5–6) ||Aardsma (16)  || 27,975 || 29–41  ||
|- align="center" bgcolor="bbffbb"
| 71 || June 23 || Cubs || 8–1 || Lee (6–3) || Wells (3–6) ||  || 31,394 || 30–41 ||
|- align="center" bgcolor="ffbbbb"
| 72 || June 24 || Cubs || 3–2 (13) || Grabow (1–3) || Olsen (0–2) || Gorzelanny (1) || 41,329 || 30–42 || 
|- align="center" bgcolor="ffbbbb"
| 73 || June 25 || @ Brewers || 8–3 || Bush (3–5) || Rowland-Smith (1–7) ||  || 30,087 || 30–43 || 
|- align="center" bgcolor="bbffbb"
| 74 || June 26 || @ Brewers || 5–4 || Sweeney (1–0) || Wolf (5–7) || League (2) || 41,655 || 31–43 || 
|- align="center" bgcolor="ffbbbb"
| 75 || June 27 || @ Brewers || 3–0 || Narveson (7–4) || Vargas (6–3) || Axford (7) || 41,995 || 31–44 || 
|- align="center" bgcolor="bbffbb"
| 76 || June 29 || @ Yankees || 7–4 || Lee (7–3) || Hughes (10–2) ||  || 45,780 || 32–44 || 
|- align="center" bgcolor="bbffbb"
| 77 || June 30 || @ Yankees || 7–0 || Hernández (6–5) || Vázquez (6–7) ||  || 46,309 || 33–44 || 
|-

|- bgcolor="ffbbbb"
|- align="center" bgcolor="ffbbbb"
| 78 || July 1 || @ Yankees || 4–2 || Sabathia (10–3) || Aardsma (0–5) || Rivera (18) || 45,591 || 33–45 ||
|- align="center" bgcolor="ffbbbb"
| 79 || July 2 || @ Tigers || 7–1 || Scherzer (5–6) || Fister (3–4) ||  || 32,512 || 33–46 ||
|- align="center" bgcolor="ffbbbb"
| 80 || July 3 || @ Tigers || 6–1 || Verlander (10–5) || Vargas (6–4) ||  || 32,430 || 33–47 ||
|- align="center" bgcolor="bbffbb"
| 81 || July 4 || @ Tigers || 8–1 || Lee (8–3) || Bonderman (4–6) ||  || 24,899 || 34–47 ||
|- align="center" bgcolor="ffbbbb"
| 82 || July 5 || Royals || 6–4 (10) || Farnsworth (2–0) || Cordero (0–1) || Soria (23) || 22,617 || 34–48 ||
|- align="center" bgcolor="ffbbbb"
| 83 || July 6 || Royals || 3–2 || Greinke (5–8) || Rowland-Smith (1–8) || Soria (24) || 17,555 || 34–49 ||
|- align="center" bgcolor="ffbbbb"
| 84 || July 7 || Royals || 7–3 || Marte (3–0) || League (5–6) || Soria (25) || 16,954 || 34–50 ||
|- align="center" bgcolor="ffbbbb"
| 85 || July 8 || Yankees || 3–1 || Pettitte (11–2) || Aardsma (0–6) || Rivera (20) || 37,432 || 34–51 ||
|- align="center" bgcolor="ffbbbb"
| 86 || July 9 || Yankees || 6–1 || Hughes (11–2) || Pauley (0–1) ||  || 39,645 || 34–52 ||
|- align="center" bgcolor="bbffbb"
| 87 || July 10 || Yankees || 4–1 || Hernández (7–5) || Chamberlain (1–4) ||  || 42,558 || 35–52 ||  
|- align="center" bgcolor="ffbbbb"
| 88 || July 11 || Yankees || 8–2 || Sabathia (12–3) || Rowland-Smith (1–9) ||  || 42,069 || 35–53 ||
|- align="center" bgcolor="ffbbbb"
| 89 || July 15 || @ Angels || 8–3 || Piñeiro (10–6) || Fister (3–5) ||  || 41,959 || 35–54 ||
|- align="center" bgcolor="ffbbbb"
| 90 || July 16 || @ Angels || 3–2 || Weaver (9–5) || Hernández (7–6) || Fuentes (17) || 41,449 || 35–55 ||
|- align="center" bgcolor="ffbbbb"
| 91 || July 17 || @ Angels || 7–6 || Jepsen (2–1) || Sweeney (1–1) || Fuentes (18) || 42,977 || 35–56 ||
|- align="center" bgcolor="bbffbb"
| 92 || July 18 || @ Angels || 2–1 (10) || League (6–6) || Jepsen (2–2) || Aardsma (17) || 38,883 || 36–56 ||
|- align="center" bgcolor="ffbbbb"
| 93 || July 19 || White Sox || 6–1 || Hudson (1–0) || Pauley (0–2) ||  || 21,749 || 36–57 ||
|- align="center" bgcolor="ffbbbb"
| 94 || July 20 || White Sox || 4–0 || Danks (10–7) || Fister (3–6) ||  || 21,366 || 36–58 ||
|- align="center" bgcolor="bbffbb"
| 95 || July 21 || White Sox || 2–1 (11) || League (7–6) || Jenks (1–3) ||  || 21,529 || 37–58 ||
|- align="center" bgcolor="ffbbbb"
| 96 || July 22 || Red Sox || 8–6 (13) || Okajima (3–2) || Olson (0–3) || R. Ramírez (2) || 28,074 || 37–59 ||
|- align="center" bgcolor="ffbbbb"
| 97 || July 23 || Red Sox || 2–1 || Atchison (2–1) || Vargas (6–5) || Papelbon (22) || 34,932 || 37–60 ||
|- align="center" bgcolor="bbffbb"
| 98 || July 24 || Red Sox || 5–1 || Seddon (1–0) || Lester (11–5) ||  || 43,694 || 38–60 ||
|- align="center" bgcolor="bbffbb"
| 99 || July 25 || Red Sox || 4–2 || League (8–6) || Okajima (3–3) || Aardsma (18) || 40,001 || 39–60 ||
|- align="center" bgcolor="ffbbbb"
| 100 || July 26 || @ White Sox || 6–1 || Danks (11–7) || Hernández (7–7) ||  || 38,815 || 39–61 ||
|- align="center" bgcolor="ffbbbb"
| 101 || July 27 || @ White Sox || 11–0 || Floyd (6–8) || Rowland-Smith (1–10) ||  || 26,080 || 39–62 ||
|- align="center" bgcolor="ffbbbb"
| 102 || July 28 || @ White Sox || 6–5 || Thornton (3–3) || Wright (1–3) || Jenks (21) || 25,126 || 39–63 ||
|- align="center" bgcolor="ffbbbb"
| 103 || July 29 || @ White Sox || 9–5 || García (10–4) || Pauley (0–3)  ||  || 28,483 || 39–64 ||
|- align="center" bgcolor="ffbbbb"
| 104 || July 30 || @ Twins || 5–3 || Baker (9–9) || Fister (3–7) || Capps (27) || 40,596 || 39–65 ||
|- align="center" bgcolor="ffbbbb"
| 105 || July 31 || @ Twins || 4–0 || Slowey (10–5) || Hernández (7–8) ||  || 40,799 || 39–66 ||  
|-

|- bgcolor="ffbbbb"
|- align="center" bgcolor="ffbbbb"
| 106 || August 1 || @ Twins || 4–0 || Liriano (10–7) || French (0–2) ||  || 40,374 || 39–67 ||
|- align="center" bgcolor="bbffbb"
| 107 || August 3 || Rangers || 3–2 || Vargas (7–5) || Lewis (9–8) || Aardsma (19) || 23,466 || 40–67 ||
|- align="center" bgcolor="ffbbbb"
| 108 || August 4 || Rangers || 11–6 || Feldman (6–9) || Fister (3–8) ||  || 20,174 || 40–68 ||
|- align="center" bgcolor="ffbbbb"
| 109 || August 5 || Rangers || 6–0 || Hunter (9–1) || Hernández (7–9) ||  || 22,624 || 40–69 ||
|- align="center" bgcolor="bbffbb"
| 110 || August 6 || Royals || 7–1 || French (1–2) || Greinke (7–11) ||  || 20,411 || 41–69 ||
|- align="center" bgcolor="ffbbbb"
| 111 || August 7 || Royals || 2–1 || Chen (7–5) || Pauley (0–4) || Soria (31) || 24,520 || 41–70 ||
|- align="center" bgcolor="bbffbb"
| 112 || August 8 || Royals || 3–2 || Vargas (8–5) || Davies (5–7) || Aardsma (20) || 24,078 || 42–70 ||
|- align="center" bgcolor="bbffbb"
| 113 || August 9 || Athletics || 3–1 || Fister (4–8) || Mazzaro (6–4) || Aardsma (21) || 19,943 || 43–70 ||
|- align="center" bgcolor="bbffbb"
| 114 || August 10 || Athletics || 2–0 || Hernández (8–9) || Anderson (3–3) || Aardsma (22) || 21,377 || 44–70 ||
|- align="center" bgcolor="ffbbbb"
| 115 || August 11 || Athletics || 5–1 || Braden (7–8) || French (1–3) ||  || 31,560 || 44–71 ||
|- align="center" bgcolor="bbffbb"
| 116 || August 13 || @ Indians || 3–2 || Pauley (1–4) || Carmona (11–10) || Aardsma (23) || 26,424 || 45–71 ||
|- align="center" bgcolor="bbffbb"
| 117 || August 14 || @ Indians || 9–3 || Vargas (9–5) || Talbot (8–10) ||  || 25,980 || 46–71 ||
|- align="center" bgcolor="ffbbbb"
| 118 || August 15 || @ Indians || 9–1 || Sipp (2–2) || Hernández (8–10) ||  || 14,888 || 46–72 ||
|- align="center" bgcolor="ffbbbb"
| 119 || August 16 || @ Orioles || 5–4 || Albers (5–3) || White (0–1) ||  || 12,375 || 46–73 ||
|- align="center" bgcolor="bbffbb"
| 120 || August 17 || @ Orioles || 4–0 || French (2–3) || Millwood (2–13) || League (3) || 14,739 || 47–73 ||
|- align="center" bgcolor="bbffbb"
| 121 || August 18 || @ Orioles || 6–5 || Pauley (2–4) || Guthrie (7–12) || Aardsma (24) || 11,213 || 48–73 ||
|- align="center" bgcolor="bbffbb"
| 122 || August 20 || @ Yankees || 6–0 || Hernández (9–10) || Burnett (9–11) ||  || 46,493 || 49–73 ||
|- align="center" bgcolor="ffbbbb"
| 123 || August 21 || @ Yankees || 9–5 || Logan (1–0) || Vargas (9–6) || Rivera (25) || 48,158 || 49–74 ||
|- align="center" bgcolor="ffbbbb"
| 124 || August 22 || @ Yankees || 10–0 || Sabathia (17–5) || French (2–4) ||  || 46,778 || 49–75 ||
|- align="center" bgcolor="ffbbbb"
| 125 || August 23 || @ Red Sox || 6–3 || Lackey (12–7) || Fister (4–9) || Papelbon (31) || 37,133 || 49–76 ||
|- align="center" bgcolor="bbbbbb"
| – || August 24 || @ Red Sox || colspan=7|Postponed (rain) Rescheduled for August 25  
|- align="center" bgcolor="ffbbbb"
| 126 || August 25 || @ Red Sox || 5–3 || Beckett (4–3) || Pauley (2–5) || Papelbon (32) || 37,183 || 49–77 ||
|- align="center" bgcolor="bbffbb"
| 127 || August 25 || @ Red Sox || 4–2 || Hernández (10–10) || Wakefield (3–10) || League (4) || 37,451 || 50–77 ||
|- align="center" bgcolor="ffbbbb"
| 128 || August 27 || Twins || 6–3 || Baker (12–9) || Vargas (9–7) ||  || 37,798 || 50–78 ||
|- align="center" bgcolor="ffbbbb"
| 129 || August 28 || Twins || 1–0 || Blackburn (8–8) || Fister (4–10) || Fuentes (24) || 29,892 || 50–79 ||
|- align="center" bgcolor="bbffbb"
| 130 || August 29 || Twins || 2–1 || French (3–4) || Pavano (15–10) || Aardsma (25) || 28,923 || 51–79 ||
|- align="center" bgcolor="ffbbbb"
| 131 || August 30 || Angels || 5–3 || Santana (14–9) || Pauley (2–6) || Rodney (7) || 20,545 || 51–80 ||
|- align="center" bgcolor="bbffbb"
| 132 || August 31 || Angels || 3–1 || League (9–6) || Jepsen (2–4) || Aardsma (26) || 18,737 || 52–80 || 
|-

|- bgcolor="ffbbbb"
|- align="center" bgcolor="ffbbbb"
| 133 || September 1 || Angels || 4–2 || Bell (2–4) || Vargas (9–8) || Rodney (8) || 17,515 || 52–81 || 
|- align="center" bgcolor="ffbbbb"
| 134 || September 2 || Indians || 6–3 || Tomlin (3–3) || Fister (4–11) || Perez (17) || 17,269 || 52–82 || 
|- align="center" bgcolor="bbffbb"
| 135 || September 3 || Indians || 1–0 || French (4–4) || Carmona (11–14) || Aardsma (27) || 17,271 || 53–82 || 
|- align="center" bgcolor="ffbbbb"
| 136 || September 4 || Indians || 4–2 || Talbot (9–11) || Pauley (2–7) || Perez (18) || 25,108 || 53–83 || 
|- align="center" bgcolor="bbffbb"
| 137 || September 5 || Indians || 3–0 || Hernández (11–10) || Gómez (3–3) || Aardsma (28) || 22,621 || 54–83 || 
|- align="center" bgcolor="ffbbbb"
| 138 || September 6 || @ Athletics || 6–2 || Anderson (4–6) || Vargas (9–9) ||  || 11,581 || 54–84 ||
|- align="center" bgcolor="bbffbb"
| 139 || September 7 || @ Athletics || 7–5 || Fister (5–11) || Braden (9–11) || Aardsma (29) || 10,067 || 55–84 ||
|- align="center" bgcolor="ffbbbb"
| 140 || September 8 || @ Athletics || 4–3 || Gonzalez (14–8) || French (4–5) || Bailey (22) || 15,180 || 55–85 ||
|- align="center" bgcolor="ffbbbb"
| 141 || September 10 || @ Angels || 4–3 (14) || Thompson (1–0) || Sweeney (1–2) ||  || 42,203 || 55–86 ||
|- align="center" bgcolor="ffbbbb"
| 142 || September 11 || @ Angels || 7–4 || Santana (16–9) || Hernández (11–11) || Rodney (9) || 39,123 || 55–87 ||
|- align="center" bgcolor="ffbbbb"
| 143 || September 12 || @ Angels || 3–0 || Haren (10–12) || Vargas (9–10) || Rodney (10) || 42,357 || 55–88 ||
|- align="center" bgcolor="ffbbbb"
| 144 || September 13 || Red Sox || 5–1 || Lester (17–8) || Fister (5–12) ||  || 19,063 || 55–89 ||
|- align="center" bgcolor="ffbbbb"
| 145 || September 14 || Red Sox || 9–6 || Hill (1–0) || League (9–7) ||  || 18,381 || 55–90 ||
|- align="center" bgcolor="ffbbbb"
| 146 || September 15 || Red Sox || 5–1 || Buchholz (16–7) || Pauley (2–8) ||  || 21,936 || 55–91 ||
|- align="center" bgcolor="bbffbb"
| 147 || September 17 || Rangers || 2–1 || Hernández (12–11) || Wilson (14–7) || Aardsma (30) || 19,302 || 56–91 ||
|- align="center" bgcolor="ffbbbb"
| 148 || September 18 || Rangers || 6–1 || Lee (12–8) || Vargas (9–11) ||  || 20,843 || 56–92 ||
|- align="center" bgcolor="bbffbb"
| 149 || September 19 || Rangers || 2–1 || Fister (6–12) || Hunter (12–4) || Aardsma (31) || 20,764 || 57–92 ||
|- align="center" bgcolor="ffbbbb"
| 150 || September 21 || @ Blue Jays || 5–3 || Rzepczynski (2–4) || French (4–6) || Gregg (34) || 12,158 || 57–93 ||
|- align="center" bgcolor="bbffbb"
| 151 || September 22 || @ Blue Jays || 6–3 || Pauley (3–8) || Drabek (0–2) ||  || 12,302 || 58–93 ||
|- align="center" bgcolor="ffbbbb"
| 152 || September 23 || @ Blue Jays || 1–0 || Hill (1–2) || Hernández (12–12) || Gregg (35) || 12,590 || 58–94 ||
|- align="center" bgcolor="ffbbbb"
| 153 || September 24 || @ Rays || 5–3 || Niemann (11–7) || Vargas (9–12) || Soriano (44) || 17,840 || 58–95 ||
|- align="center" bgcolor="ffbbbb"
| 154 || September 25 || @ Rays || 9–1 || Garza (15–9) || Fister (6–13) ||  || 26,427 || 58–96 ||
|- align="center" bgcolor="bbffbb"
| 155 || September 26 || @ Rays || 6–2 || French (5–6) || Shields (13–14) ||  || 22,301 || 59–96 ||
|- align="center" bgcolor="bbffbb"
| 156 || September 27 || @ Rangers || 7–5 || Pauley (4–8) || Wilson (14–8) || League (5) || 29,381 || 60–96 ||
|- align="center" bgcolor="bbffbb"
| 157 || September 28 || @ Rangers || 3–1 || Hernández (13–12) || Feldman (7–11) || League (6) || 26,043 || 61–96 ||
|- align="center" bgcolor="ffbbbb"
| 158 || September 29 || @ Rangers || 6–5 || Feliz (4–3) || Cortes (0–1) ||  || 23,052 || 61–97 ||
|- align="center" bgcolor="ffbbbb"
| 159 || September 30 || Athletics || 8–1 || Gonzalez (15–9) || Fister (6–14) ||  || 16,940 || 61–98 ||
|-

|-bgcolor="ffbbbb"
|- align="center" bgcolor="ffbbbb"
| 160 || October 1 || Athletics || 9–0 || Cahill (18–8) || French (5–7) ||  || 19,656 || 61–99 ||
|- align="center" bgcolor="ffbbbb"
| 161 || October 2 || Athletics || 5–3 || Anderson (7–6) || Pauley (4–9) || Breslow (4) || 17,717 || 61–100 || 
|- align="center" bgcolor="ffbbbb"
| 162 || October 3 || Athletics || 4–3 || Braden (11–14) || Varvaro (0–1) || Breslow (5) || 23,263 || 61–101 || 
|-

Standings

Division standings

Record against opponents

Players stats

Batting
Note: G = Games played; AB = At bats; R = Runs scored; H = Hits; 2B = Doubles; 3B = Triples; HR = Home runs; RBI = Runs batted in; BB = Base on balls; SB = Stolen bases; AVG = Batting average

Source: ESPN.com

Pitching
Note: W = Wins; L = Losses; ERA = Earned run average; G = Games pitched; GS = Games started; SV=Saves; IP = Innings pitched; H =Hits; ER = Earned runs allowed; HR= Home Run allowed; BB = Walks allowed;  SO = Strikeouts  

Source: ESPN.com
 Through October 3, 2010.

Roster

Minor league affiliates

References

External links
2010 Seattle Mariners at Baseball Reference
2010 Seattle Mariners season Official Site

Seattle Mariners seasons
Seattle Mariners season
Seattle Marin
Seattle Mariners